Big Business Girl is a 1931 pre-Code First National sound comedy film directed by William A. Seiter and starring  Loretta Young, then eighteen years old. It was released theatrically through First National's parent company Warner Bros.

Plot

Cast

 Loretta Young as Claire McIntyre
 Frank Albertson as Johnny Saunders
 Ricardo Cortez as Robert J. Clayton
 Joan Blondell as Pearl
 Frank Darien as Luke Winters
 Dorothy Christy as Mrs. Emery
 Oscar Apfel as Walter Morley
 Nancy Dover as Sarah Ellen
 Mickey Bennett as Joe
 Bobby Gordon as Messenger boy
 Virginia Sale as Sally Curtis
 George 'Gabby' Hayes as Hotel Clerk

Preservation status
A copy is preserved at the Library of Congress.

Home media
The film was released on VHS as part of the 'Forbidden Hollywood' series by MGM/UA Home Video.

References

External links
 
 
 
 

1931 films
Films directed by William A. Seiter
First National Pictures films
American romantic comedy films
1931 romantic comedy films
American black-and-white films
Warner Bros. films
Films with screenplays by Robert Lord (screenwriter)
1930s American films